Consent is a 2023 UK TV drama film set in an upper class school in England. It tells the story of a working-class black girl who attends a previously all-male public school where misogyny is rife. She is raped while unconscious by one of the pupils, and faces an uphill struggle for complaints to be taken seriously in the face of the power of the school and the boy's parents' wealth.

Background

Ofsted, wrote Anita Singh in The Telegraph, reported how "sexual harassment is a normal part of school life", which she says "is the starting point for Consent". She says it was "inspired by true events", as recorded in "numerous testimonies" she encountered. According to Channel 4, the film attempts to demonstrate "what it feels like for young people in an environment where sexual expectations are distorted by the instant access to porn and where the lines of consent are minimised". Hundreds of hours of testimony—from both private and state schools were used as evidence as to teen culture, and Dennis-Edwards later expressed herself "shocked" at the toxicity of the culture she encountered. Rafaele commented that while "school should be a safe, nurturing space", it was clear to her that very often the environment was toxic one.

Cast

Main 
Lashay Anderson as Natalie, the protagonist
Tom Victor as Archie, rapes Natalie
Rhea Norwood as Alice, Archie's twin 
Ty Tennant as Raffy, leading member of the boy's WhatsApp group
Nell Barlow as Lily, the only girl to stand by Natalie
Kimberley Nixon as Natalie's "ineffectual" tutor.
Alex Heath as Kyle, a member of the WhatsApp group who provides Natalie with evidence
Denzel Baidoo as Kojo, a member of the boys' group
Dee Ahluwalia as Navjot, another member of the WhatsApp group

Additional 

 Richard Harrington as the headmaster
 Geoffrey Streatfeild as Lawrence 
 Elen Rhys as Fiona
 Matthew Doman as Rob
 Emma Dennis-Edwards as Sara
 Tonya Smith as Lisa

Production
Channel Four announced on 31 January 2023 that Rita Daniels, of the broadcaster's Drama Commissioning department, had commissioned the hour-long film from Firebird Pictures. Consent was written by first-time screen writer Emma Dennis-Edwards, directed by Nadira Amrani and executively produced by Aysha Rafaele. Burlingdale School scenes were filmed in Atlantic College, a Vale of Glamorgan boarding school near Cardiff. The capital was also the location for Natalie's house, while Archie and Alice's house was filmed in Penarth.

Premise
The story is told from the point of view of Natalie, a working class girl who has recently joined a prestigious, upper-class public school on a scholarship. Until recently, the school was entirely a boys school; the admission of girls into the sixth form is a relatively recent development. Natalie encounters a strongly misogynist lad culture thrives, and derogatory comments towards girls are an everyday occurrence. There is also a strong culture of watching and sharing porn among the boys. The WhatsApp group—comments such as "Stick your dick in her mouth. Shut her up" are common—appear as actual characters when Archie gets a message; hence, in the scene where they all watch the same porn clip, all five appear on the sofa next Archie and start masturbating, seemingly together. Natalie discovers what taking on an elite group means.

Plot
Natalie, a confident black girl attends the upper-class Burlingdale School on a scholarship. wins the school debating society and is named its captain. Her best friend is Alice, twin brother of Archie. Archie is a member of a close-knit WhatsApp group and characterises the college, being "rich, privileged and an academic high achiever". Nevertheless, Archie portrays himself as not fitting in with this culture, as, for example, he sits out rugby lessons. This leads to him seeming to develop feelings for Natalie for being the outsider he thought he was.They establish a flirtatious relationship. It is soon Archie's and Alice's 18th birthday, and his parents spend the night elsewhere while he has a house party. The WhatsApp group urge Archie that he owed "birthday sex". Alcohol, drugs and sex abound. Archie takes a near-unconscious Natalie to his bedroom, where he films himself having sex with her; Natalie's eyes barely flicker.The porn culture among Archie's WhatsApp group, combined with a philosophy that if it can't be proved to have happened it didn't happen—in Raffy's words, "no face, no case"—means that Archie videos his sex with Natalie and shares it among the group. The next day, Natalie knows something is wrong but cannot recall specific events; she realises that Archie had sex with her, to which he claims she consented.Natlaie complains to the school, and is supported by a female teacher. She loses the friendship of Alice, however, who sticks by her brother, and his parents call in their solicitors]]. The WhatsApp group delete the video Archie sent them, intending to eradicate the evidence; however, one member, Kyle, leaves the group before they do so. Archie's parents threaten to sue the school in retaliation and the headmaster allows Archie to stay on condition he read a leaflet from Alcoholics Anonymous. Defeated by the school's closed ranks, Natalie no longer feels comfortable at the school and leaves, realising that she cannot defeat the school, parents and pupils on her own. Sometime later, Archie wins an award at a school prize giving for essay writing. As he is shaking the headmaster's hand, Kyle, in the front row, pulls up the video of Artchie and Natalie, which he never deleted from his phone, and texts it to her, also saying "I'm sorry". She receives and watches it and realises this is the evidence she needed. The film closes with the audience hearing her phone the police to report her rape.

Reception

According to the marketing body for UK commercial television, Consent was watched by approximately 316,000 viewers at the time of broadcast, which combined with 83,000 VOSDAL viewers and 165,000 saving it for later made it the 34th most-watched Chanel Four program of the week with 8.4% of their national audience.

Consent has been described by Anita Singh in The Telegraph as "required viewing" for UK schools, particularly teenagers, and in style and construction has been compared with John Hughes 1980 Brat Pack film, Pretty in Pink. Writing in Stylist magazine, Kayleigh Dray favourably compared the film's portrayal of its themes to such recent documentary pieces as Zara McDermott's 2021 Uncovering Rape Culture, which saw McDermott draw on her own experience of almost being raped. In The Guardian, Barbara Ellen drew connections with the broader Metoo movement and how it intersects with the ethics of consent and peer-pressure. The choice of casting the Archie character as the main protagonist was praised by Sophie McBain in the New Statesman, who suggested that had, for example, the film focussed on Raffy, it would have been far less powerful viewing.

The acting out of their WhatsApp messages by the characters was criticised by Singh, which she suggested was "stagey" and detracted from the film's authenticity, as also, she felt the use of actors older than those they were portraying. The online legal journal Lexology also criticised the film as while holding lofty ambitions to play a role in the fight against tox masculinity, it eventually realised itself as a lost opportunity. Matthew Hardcastle of Kingsley Napley argues that, notwithstanding that the narrative was already flawed by its relatively short length, numerous legal matters were either misunderstood—that, for example, Natalie's accusations would only be taken seriously with backing evidence-omitted entirely, such as the fact that school-led investigations would usually be multi-agency led, or downplayed (for example, the role of social media was covered from the boys' perspective but would also have provided a forum for a backlash. Finally, Hardcastle argues, while we see Natalie make her report to the police, we then do not see the consequences on the numerous lives this would have gave impacted: "Perhaps the single biggest difference between Consent and real-life was the portrayal of certainty in circumstances where there often is none".  

Soma Sara, who founded the anti-rape website, Everyone's Invited, welcomed the film's release, stating in Glamour magazine that she saw it as restarting an urgent discussion in UK schools. The film was described by Morgan Cormack in The Radio Times as "one of the most important watches" of the year, based mainly on its approach to themes such as porn culture, sexual harassment and misogyny, but also on how it suggested the inability or unwillingness of staff to recognise the extent of the issue. Ellen E. Jones, writing in The Guardian considered that, in Consent, "there is a lot that is timely about... [it] and a lot that is horribly timeless". She also notes issues of race highlighted when, for example, Raffy—"his hair an apt shade of Slytherin blonde"—refers to the black, working-class Natalie as "trying to get Markled". She compared the film, in some of its issues, as akin to The Inbetweeners, but with a tragic aggressive rather than humorous, premise. A similar comparison was made by McBain, who—describing Raffy as "cartoonishly awful"—compares him to The Inbetweeners' Jay Cartwright, had the latter "been born into the Andrew Tate generation". Jones highlights Victor's careful portrayal, almost simultaneously, as both "a confused, fearful child and a dangerously self-pitying man". Jones argues that, while the film appears to end on a positive note—with Natalie having both the courage and the evidence to report her rape:

External links
Review of Sexual Abuse in Schools and Colleges, Ofsted report of 10 June 2021.
A Year On: the Government's update on the Ofsted review a year later in 2022.

Notes

References

Bibliography 

 
 
 
 

 
 

2023 films
Films about rape in the United Kingdom
Films set in schools
2020s British films